The men's 67 kilograms competition at the 2022 World Weightlifting Championships was held on 8 and 9 December 2022.

Schedule

Medalists

Records

Results

References

Men's 67 kg